Ian Petrella (born December 17, 1974) is an American actor and puppeteer.

Career
Petrella is best known for the role of Randy Parker in the 1983 film A Christmas Story. He reprised the role for the 2022 sequel A Christmas Story Christmas.

From November 4, 2010, to the first week of January 2011, he served as a guest tour guide at the A Christmas Story House in Cleveland, Ohio.

Personal life
Petrella currently resides in Cleveland, Ohio, working in animation and puppetry.

Filmography

References

External links

1974 births
Living people
American male film actors
American male television actors
American male child actors
Male actors from Los Angeles
20th-century American male actors